This is an incomplete list of multinational festivals and holidays.

January 
Christianity
 Feast of the Circumcision: 1 January
 Twelfth Night (Epiphany Eve): 5 January
 Epiphany: 6 January – the arrival of the Three Magi
 Armenian Apostolic Christmas: 6 January
 Orthodox Christmas: 7 January – in churches using dates corresponding to the old Julian calendar, 7 January is equivalent to 25 December in the Gregorian calendar.
Secular
 Saint Basil's Day: 1 January – In Greece, traditionally he is the Father Christmas figure.
 New Year's Day: 1 January – First day of the Gregorian Year.
 Old New Year: 14 January: New Year's Day according to the "old" Julian calendar. Includes a winter ritual of strolling and singing that was later incorporated into the Christmas carol.
Sikhism
 Lohri/Bhogi: 13 January
Telugu, Karnataka, Gujarat and Maharashtra
 Makar Sankranti: 14 January
Tamil Nadu
 Pongal: 14 January
Punjab
 Lohri: 14 January

February
Tibetan Buddhism 
 Losar: Sometime in February (Moveable)
Christianity
 Candlemas: 2 February – Feast of the Presentation of the Lord; 40 days after Christmas; end of Christmas/Epiphany Season.
Paganism
 Imbolc: 1 February – first day of spring in the Celtic calendar.
Satanism
 Lupercalia: 15 February – A TST Satanic celebration of bodily autonomy, sexual liberation, and reproduction; based on the Roman end-of-winter festival of the same name.
Secular
 Groundhog Day: 2 February
 Darwin Day: 12 February
 Saint Valentine's Day: 14 February

March
Paganism
 Ostara, Spring equinox: 21 March
Christianity
 Lent: typically in March, but sometimes in February – the six weeks preceding Easter, starting with Ash Wednesday.  See "Movable"
Judaism
 Purim: typically in March, but sometimes in February. See "Movable"
Secular
 Saint David's Day: 1 March – the fixed date to honor Saint David, patron saint of Wales, celebrated by Welshmen and women everywhere throughout the world.
 International Women's Day: 8 March
 World Kidney Day: second Thursday of March
 Saint Patrick's Day: 17 March – the fixed date to honor Saint Patrick has sometimes been moved by Church if it coincides with Holy Week, but the secular world generally always celebrates it on 17 March.
 World Down Syndrome Awareness Day - 21 March
Secular and multiple religions
 Nowruz/Newroz (نه‌ورۆز/نوروز) : spring equinox (on or near 21 March) – originally the Iranian New Year, celebrated as a secular holiday in Iran and many neighbouring countries and as a religious holiday by Alawites, Alevis, Baháʼís, Bektashis, Zoroastrians, and most Shi'a Muslims.
Maithil
 Sapta-Bipta (Maithil worship festival Sapta Mai worship)
Hinduism
 Holi (Hindu holiday in honor of Lord Vishnu)
 Dhulendi: 6 March
 Ram Navami: 28 March - Birthday of Lord Rama is celebrated all over India. The epic Ramayana is recited in temples and homes.

April
Judaism
 Pesach: late March or in April. See "movable"
Buddhism
 Hanamatsuri: 8 April – Celebrated in Japan as Buddha's Birthday.
Islam
 Ramadan: 14 April
Secular
 April Fools' Day: 1 April
 World Autism Awareness Day: 2 April
 Children’s Day: 4 April
 420: 20 April, celebrated within cannabis culture
 Earth Day: 22 April
 Saint George's Day: 23 April
 Anzac Day: 25 April
Christianity
 Good Friday: the Friday preceding Easter Sunday, see "movable"
 Holy Saturday: also called Easter Eve, the Saturday preceding Easter Sunday, see "movable"
 Easter: typically in April, but sometimes in March or May, see "movable"
Hinduism
 Rama Navami: birth of the god Rama
 Hanuman Jayanti: typically a week after Rama Navami, in honour of the birth of Hanuman
 Gangaur: occurring in April, in honour of the victory of Goddess Mahagauri
 Maithil: occurring in April, Joor-seetal First day of Mithila calendar
Satanism
 Hexennacht: 30 April – A TST Satanic occasion solemnly honoring those who fell victim to superstition and pseudoscience, whether by witch hunt, Satanic panic, or other injustices.
South and Southeast Asian
 Traditional New Year: 14 April (Usually between 12-14 April. Date is reckoned based on sun's entry into the constellation Aries)  –   In many South and Southeast Asian cultures the festival is based on harvesting of crops and a new beginning marked by the sun's entry into the constellation Aries.

May
Judaism
 Yom HaShoah
 Lag BaOmer
 Shavuot: usually in May, but sometimes in June. See "Movable"
Paganism
 May Day: 1 May – a traditional spring holiday in many cultures.
Buddhism
 Vesak: Buddha's Birthday – celebrated on Vesak Full Moon by most buddhists.
Secular
 International Workers' Day: 1 May
 Star Wars Day: May the 4th
 Cinco de Mayo "May 5"
 Matariki: The "Maori new year" festival running between a week and month from late May, celebrated by kite flying and a range of artistic activities.
 Yom HaZikaron
Maithil
 Raib-Shain Paavein Worship of Sun and Saturn god

June
 Inti Raymi: late June – festival of the Sun in Quechua, winter solstice festival in areas of the former Inca Empire, still celebrated every June in Cusco.
 We Tripantu
Hinduism
 Ratha Yatra: procession of Vishnu
Islam
 Eid al-Fitr: 24 May 2020
Secular
 World Environment Day: 5 June
 World Humanist Day: 21 June
 midsummer: 21 June

July
 Yulefest/Midwinter Christmas: late June or July – Australian/New Zealander winter 'Christmas/Yuletide'
Buddhism 
 Asalha Puja: Dhamma Day a Day When First Time Buddha gave Dhamma (updesh) To his First Five Sermons It Celebrate on full moon Day of Ashaldh
Hinduism
 Guru Purnima: a reverential day in honour of all teachers and instructors.
 Devshayani Ekadashi: solemnity of the repose of Vishnu, coincides with the first day of the highly inauspicious Chaturmas season.
Islam
 Eid al-Adha: 20 July
Satanism
 Unveiling Day: 25 July – A TST Satanic celebration of religious plurality and shedding archaic superstition; celebrated on the date upon which The Satanic Temple's Baphomet statue was unveiled in 2015, an icon of modern Satanism created with "respect for diversity and religious minorities" in mind.

August
Christianity
 Assumption of Mary: 15 August
 Saint Bartholomew's Day: 24 August
Hinduism
 Raksha Bandhan: a festival commemorating filial love.
 Krishna Janmashtami: birth anniversary of Krishna.
 Onam: a festival of Kerala, India.
Secular
 International Friendship Day: 2 August
 International Lefthanders Day: 13 August

September
Judaism
 Rosh Hashanah: usually September, sometimes early October see "Moveable"
 Yom Kippur: late September, early October see "Moveable"
 Sukkot: sometimes late September, usually October see "Moveable"
Secular
 Labor Day/Labour Day: first Monday of September (US/Canada)
 International Talk Like a Pirate Day: 19 September
 World Peace Day: 21 September

October
Judaism
 Simchat Torah
Buddhism
 Dhammachakra Pravartan Din: a Buddhist festival in India that celebrates the Buddhist conversion of B. R. Ambedkar and his followers.
Hinduism
 Navratri: celebrates the conquest of Goddess Durga
 Diwali: mid-October–mid-November – see "movable"
 Kartik Purnima: An additional commemoration of the Celestial Diwali, or the "Diwali of the Gods"; hence the Sanskrit appellation "Dev Diwali", in honour of Vishnu, Kartikeya and Goddess Ganga. 
Paganism
 Samhain: 31 October–1 November – first day of winter in the Celtic calendar (and Celtic New Year's Day)
Secular
 Gandhi Jayanti: an indoctrinated festival; the birth anniversary of Mahatma Gandhi, falls on 2 October.
 Halloween: 31 October – also known as Allhalloween, All Hallows' Eve, or All Saints' Eve, is a celebration observed in many countries on 31 October, the eve of the Western Christian feast of All Hallows' Day.

November
Christianity
 All Saints'/Souls' Day: 1-2 November – in Western Christian churches.
 Dia de los muertos (Day of the Dead): 1-2 November – Celebrated in mostly Catholic Mexico but with origins that predate European contact.
 Nativity Fast: forty days leading to Christmas – also Saint Philip's fast, Christmas fast, or winter Lent or fast (Eastern Christianity).
Secular
 International Pianist Day: 8 November: celebrates the mastery of playing piano
 Armistice Day (also Remembrance Day or Veterans Day): 11 November: memorial day honoring the war dead
 International Men's Day: 19 November
 Thanksgiving Day: fourth Thursday of November (US); second Monday of October (CAN)
Hinduism
 Diwali: mid-October–mid-November – see "movable"
 Mandala Vratham: mid-November to mid-January – see "movable": 48 days of fasting in honour of the deity Ayyappan begins.

December
Buddhism
 Bodhi Day: 8 December – Day of Enlightenment, celebrating the day that the historical Buddha (Shakyamuni or Siddhartha Gautama) experienced enlightenment (also known as Bodhi).
Christianity
 Advent: four Sundays preceding Christmas Day
 Saint Barbara's Day: 4 December – The Feast of St. Barbara is celebrated by Artillery regiments across the Commonwealth and some western Catholic countries.
 Krampusnacht: 5 December – The Feast of St. Nicholas is celebrated in parts of Europe on 6 December. In Alpine countries, Saint Nicholas has a devilish companion named Krampus who punishes the bad children the night before.
 Saint Nicholas Day: 6 December
 Feast of the Immaculate Conception: 8 December – The day of Virgin Mary's Immaculate Conception is celebrated as a public holiday in many Catholic countries. 
 Saint Lucy's Day: 13 December – Church Feast Day. Saint Lucy comes as a young woman with lights and sweets.
 Las Posadas: 16–24 December – procession to various family lodgings for celebration and prayer and to re-enact Mary and Joseph's journey to Bethlehem
 Longest Night: A modern Christian service to help those coping with loss, usually held on the eve of the Winter solstice.
 Nikoljdan: 19 December - the most common slava, St. Nicholas's feast day.
 Christmas Eve: 24 December – In many countries e.g. the German speaking countries, but also in Poland, Hungary and the Nordic countries, gift giving is on 24 December.  The magic of Christmas Eve is in the air. This the December global holiday Frosty snow gently falls from the sky, and you can see your breath when you exhale. It's Christmas Eve—one of the most beautiful evenings of the year.
 Christmas Day: 25 December and 7 January –  celebrated by Christians and non-Christians alike.
 Anastasia of Sirmium feast day: 25 December
 Twelve Days of Christmas: 25 December–6 January
 Saint Stephen's Day: 26 December – In Germany, Poland, the Czech Republic and Ireland a holiday celebrated as Second Day of Christmas.
 Saint John the Evangelist's Day: 27 December
 Holy Innocents' Day: 28 December
 Saint Sylvester's Day: 31 December
Hinduism
 Kathika Deepam: 6 December is a festival of lights that is observed mainly by Hindu Tamils, and also by adherents in the regions of Kerala, Andhra Pradesh, Telangana, Karnataka, and Sri Lanka. Celebrated in Tamilakam since the ancient period,[1] the festival is held on the full moon day of the Kartika (கார்த்திகை) month, called the Kartika Pournami, falling on the Gregorian months of November or December.[2] It is marked on the day the full moon is in conjunction with the constellation of Kartika. 
 Pancha Ganapati: a modern five-day Hindu festival celebrated from 21 through 25 December in honor of Ganesha.
 Vaikuntha Ekadashi: Mid December - Mid January: see "moveable".
Historical
 Malkh: 25 December
 Mōdraniht: or Mothers' Night, the Saxon winter solstice festival.
 Saturnalia: 17–23 December – An ancient Roman winter solstice festival in honor of the deity Saturn, held on 17 December of the Julian calendar and expanded with festivities through to 23 December. Celebrated with sacrifice, a public banquet, followed by private gift-giving, continual partying, and a carnival. 
 Dies Natalis Solis Invicti (Day of the birth of the Unconquered Sun): 25 December – late Roman Empire
Humanism
 HumanLight: 23 December – Humanist holiday originated by the New Jersey Humanist Network in celebration of "a Humanist's vision of a good future."
Judaism
 Hanukkah: usually falls anywhere between late November and early January. See "movable"
Paganism
 Yule: Pagan winter festival that was celebrated by the historical Germanic people from late December to early January.
 Koliada: Slavic winter festival celebrated on late December with parades and singers who visit houses and receive gifts.
 Wassailia winter celebration that lands on the first full moon of December. Celebrations include gift giving and feasts.
Persian
 Yalda: 21 December – The turning point, Winter Solstice. As the longest night of the year and the beginning of the lengthening of days, Shabe Yaldā or Shabe Chelle is an Iranian festival celebrating the victory of light and goodness over darkness and evil. Shabe yalda means 'birthday eve.' According to Persian mythology, Mithra was born at dawn on 22 December to a virgin mother. He symbolizes light, truth, goodness, strength, and friendship. Herodotus reports that this was the most important holiday of the year for contemporary Persians. In modern times Persians celebrate Yalda by staying up late or all night, a practice known as Shab Chera meaning 'night gazing'. Fruits and nuts are eaten, especially pomegranates and watermelons, whose red color invokes the crimson hues of dawn and symbolize Mithra.
Satanism
 Sol Invictus: 25 December – A TST Satanic celebration of being unconquered by superstition and consistent in the pursuit and sharing of knowledge.
Secular
 World AIDS Day: 1 December
International Day of Disabled Persons: 3 December
 Human Rights Day: 10 December
 Salgirah: 13 December - celebration of Shia Ismaili Muslims of their Imam (Aga Khan IV)
 Zamenhof Day: 15 December – Birthday of Ludwig Zamenhof, inventor of Esperanto; holiday reunion for Esperantists
 Soyal: 21 December – Zuni and Hopi
 Winter Solstice: on or about 21 December
 Dongzhi Festival – a celebration of Winter
 Festivus: 23 December – a secular holiday created by Daniel O'Keefe and then made popular by his son Dan O'Keefe, a writer on the comedy television series Seinfeld, as an alternative to Christmas
 Newtonmas: 25 December – As an alternative to celebrating the religious holiday Christmas, some atheists and skeptics have chosen to celebrate 25 December as Newtonmas, due to it being Isaac Newton's birthday on the old style date.
 Boxing Day: 26 December
 Kwanzaa: 26 December–1 January – Pan-African festival celebrated in the US
 New Year's Eve: 31 December – last day of the Gregorian year
 Ōmisoka:31 December – Japanese traditional celebration on the last day of the year
 Hogmanay: night of 31 December–before dawn of 1 January – Scottish New Year's Eve celebration
 Watch Night: 31 December
Unitarian Universalism
 Chalica: first week of December – A holiday created in 2005, celebrated by some Unitarian Universalists.
Fictional or parody
Erastide: In David Eddings' Belgariad and Malloreon series, Erastide is a celebration of the day on which the Seven Gods created the world.  Greetings ("Joyous Erastide") and gifts are exchanged, and feasts are held.
 Feast of Winter Veil: 15 December–2 January – A holiday in World of Warcraft. This holiday is based on Christmas. Cities are decorated with lights and a tree with presents. Special quests, items and snowballs are available to players during this time. The character of "Greatfather Winter", who is modeled after Santa Claus, appears. Germanic tribes used to celebrate the Winter Solstice as a time to be thankful for the blessings given to them to survive harsh winters.  The term "Weil", incorrectly translated to "veil", means abundance in German.  
 Feast of Alvis: in the TV series Sealab 2021. "Believer, you have forgotten the true meaning of Alvis Day. Neither is it ham, nor pomp. Nay, the true meaning of Alvis day is drinking. Drinking and revenge."–Alvis
 Hogswatch: a holiday celebrated in the fictional Discworld. It is very similar to the Christian celebration of Christmas.
 Frostvale: the winter holidays in the Artix Entertainment universe
 Decemberween: 25 December – a parody of Christmas that features gift-giving, carol-singing and decorated trees. The fact that it takes place on 25 December, the same day as Christmas, has been presented as just a coincidence, and it has been stated that Decemberween traditionally takes place "55 days after Halloween". The holiday has been featured in the Homestar Runner series.
 Wintersday, the end-of-the-year celebration in the fictional universe of the Guild Wars franchise, starts every year mid December and ends the next year on early January.
 IES Competition Time, Don's Event questions on the number of trips he took all over the world and in return offering prizes for the person who can guess closest. Follows this up with everyone's favourite Andrew Award presentation.
 Winter's Crest: the winter celebration held on the continent of Tal'Dorei in the world of Exandria, as featured in the RPG show Critical Role.
Candlenights: pan-religious, pan-sexual, personal pan pizza winter holiday created by Justin, Travis, and Griffin McElroy. Featured on the podcasts My Brother, My Brother, and Me, and Adventure Zone.
Snowdown: A celebration observed in Runetera, The world in which League of Legends is set. During snowdown, starting in December and ending in January "Frost-chilled days give way to colder nights, but the warmth of Snowdown calls together kindred spirits and foes alike." During this time, winter game modes, winter cosmetic map changes, and new Snowdown skins are released, as well as the previous years' Snowdown skins being made available again.
Life Day: Wookiee celebration of life, featured in the Star Wars Holiday Special, in which Wookiees gather with family, wear long red robes, sing under sacred The Tree of Life and reminisce.
The Dawning: A celebration of the Light of the Traveler, and a time to spread cheer and give gifts to help keep The Darkness at bay during the long days of the winter months. Celebrated in the Destiny franchise of video games.

Movable date
The following festivals have no fixed date in the Gregorian calendar, and may be aligned with moon cycles or other calendars.

Chinese/Vietnamese/Korean/Mongolian/Tibetan
 Lunar New Year: late January–mid February – considered the end of winter in the traditional Lunar calendar
Persian

 Sadeh: A mid-winter feast to honor fire and to "defeat the forces of darkness, frost and cold". Sadé or Sada is an ancient Iranian tradition celebrated 50 days before Nowruz. Sadeh in Persian means "hundred" and refers to one hundred days and nights left to the beginning of the new year celebrated at the first day of spring on 21 March each year. Sadeh is a midwinter festival that was celebrated with grandeur and magnificence in ancient Iran. It was a festivity to honor fire and to defeat the forces of darkness, frost, and cold.
 Chahar Shanbeh Suri: Festival of Fire, Last Wednesday of the Iranian Calendar year. It marks the importance of the light over the darkness, and arrival of spring and revival of nature. Chahārshanbe–Sūri (Persian: چهارشنبه‌سوری), pronounced Chārshanbe–Sūri (Persian: چارشنبه‌سوری) is the ancient Iranian festival dating at least back to 1700 BCE of the early Zoroastrian era.[1] The festival of fire is a prelude to the ancient Norouz festival, which marks the arrival of spring and revival of nature. Chahrshanbeh Soori, is celebrated the last Tuesday night of the year.
Mandaeism

Parwanaya: Five days that Hayyi Rabbi created the angels and the universe. The 5 epagomenals (extra days) inserted at the end of every Šumbulta (the 8th month) constitute the Parwanaya intercalary feast.
Dehwa Daimana: Birthday of John the Baptist.
Kanshiy u-Zahly: New Year's Eve
Dehwa Rabba: New Year's Day
Dehwa d-Šišlam Rabba or Nauruz Zūṭa: Little New Year, on the 6th-7th days of Daula, corresponding to Epiphany in Christianity. The Night of Power takes place on the night of the 6th day (similar to Qadr Night), during which the heavenly gates of Abatur are open to the faithful. Priests visit Mandaean households and give them myrtle wreaths to hang on their houses for the rest of the year to protect against evil. The households also donate alms to the priests.
Dehwa Hanina or Dehwa Ṭurma: the Little Feast, begins on the 18th day of Taura. This holiday commemorates the ascension of Hibil Ziwa from the underworld to the Lightworld. The feast lasts for three days. On the first day, Mandaean families visit each other and have a special breakfast of rice, yogurt, and dates. Baptisms are performed, and the dead are commemorated with lofani (ritual meals).
Ead Fel: (Memorial Day) Crushed dates with roasted sesame seeds are eaten.
Ashoriya (Ashuriyah): Day of remembrance for the drowned people of Noah's flood. Grains and cereals are eaten. Mandaeans believe that on this day, Noah and his son Sam made the food of forgiveness of sins for the souls of those who died in the flood. The food of forgiveness consists of seven grains representing the seven days of the week, and from the grounding of these seven grains came the name Abu Al-Harees. (See Ashure or Noah's pudding)
Islam
 Ramadan: During this holy time, the ninth month of the Islamic calendar year, Muslims do not eat, drink, or smoke from sunrise to sunset for an entire month. Instead, they spend their days in worship, praying in mosques. At the end of Ramadan, people celebrate with a festival known as Eid al-Fitr. 
 Eid al-Fitr is the earlier of the two official holidays celebrated within Islam (the other being Eid al-Adha). The religious holiday is celebrated by Muslims worldwide because it marks the end of the month-long dawn-to-sunset fasting of Ramadan. The day is also called Lesser Eid, or simply Eid
 Eid al-Adha is the latter of the two official holidays celebrated within Islam (the other being Eid al-Fitr). The day is also sometimes called Big Eid or the Greater Eid.

 Islamic New Year, also called the Hijri New Year or Arabic New Year, is the day that marks the beginning of a new lunar Hijri year, and is the day on which the year count is incremented. 
 Ashura is an Islamic holiday that occurs on the tenth day of Muharram, the first month in the Islamic lunar calendar. 
 Mawlid Mawlid an-Nabi ash-Sharif or Eid Milad un Nabi is the observance of the birthday of the Islamic prophet Muhammad[6] which is commemorated in Rabi' al-awwal, the third month in the Islamic calendar.
 Isra and Mi'raj are the two parts of a Night Journey that, according to Islam, the Islamic prophet Muhammad (570–632) took during a single night around the year 621. The journey and ascent are marked as one of the most celebrated dates in the Islamic calendar.
 Mid-Sha'ban also Bara'at Night, is a Muslim holiday observed by Muslim communities on the night between 14 and 15 Sha'ban (the same night as Shab-e-barat)
  Day of Arafah is an Islamic holiday that falls on the 9th day of Dhu al-Hijjah of the lunar Islamic Calendar. It is the holiest day in the Islamic calendar (the holiest night being The Night of Power), the second day of the Hajj pilgrimage, and the day after is the first day of the major Islamic holiday of Eid al-Adha.
Judaism

 Pesach: late March or in April Festival celebrating the Hebrews captivity in Egypt at the time when God commanded Moses to ask for the Hebrew people to be released.  As a result of being denied, 10 plagues came upon Egypt.  One being the Angel of death coming and the first born son of each home dying.  But God commanded the Hebrews to apply lambs blood to the door posts as a sign for the Angel to pass that house.
 Shavuot: mid May to mid June
 Rosh Hashanah: usually September, sometimes early October
 Yom Kippur: late September, early October
 Sukkot: sometimes late September, usually October
 Hanukkah – Ḥănukkāh, usually spelled חנוכה, pronounced [χanuˈka] in Modern Hebrew; a transliteration also romanized as Chanukah), also known as the Festival of Lights or the Feast of Dedication, is an eight-day Jewish holiday commemorating the re-dedication of the Holy Temple (the Second Temple) in Jerusalem at the time of the Maccabean Revolt against the Seleucid Empire of the 2nd century BC. Hanukkah is observed for eight nights and days, starting on the 25th day of Kislev according to the Hebrew calendar, which may occur at any time from late November to late December in the Gregorian calendar.
 Purim: late February, early March
Hinduism
 Diwali: mid-October–mid-November – known as the Festival of Lights, this Hindu holiday celebrates the victory of good over evil. The five-day festival is marked by ceremonies, fireworks and sweets.
 Navratri: The great nine nights of the Goddess Durga, commemorating Her victory against the demon Mahish Navratri: The great nine nights of the Goddess Durga, commemorating Her victory against the demon Mahishasura.
 Kartik Purnima
 Onam
 Janamashtami
 Rama Navami
 Maha Shivaratri
 Sharad Purnima / Lakshmi Puja / Kali Puja
 Vasant Panchami
 All Hindu festivals except Gandhi Jayanti.
Slavic

 Malanka caps off the festivities of the Christmas holidays
 Maslenitsa in Slavic mythology, a celebration of the imminent end of the winter
Christian
 Shrove Tuesday: one day before Ash Wednesday, 47 days before Easter
 Easter:  the first Sunday after the Paschal full moon/the first full moon after the vernal equinox—shortly after Passover; typically in April, but sometimes in March or May
 Good Friday: Good Friday is a Christian religious holiday commemorating the crucifixion of Jesus Christ and his death at Calvary. The holiday is observed during Holy Week as part of the Paschal Triduum on the Friday preceding Easter Sunday, and may coincide with the Jewish observance of Passover. It is also known as Holy Friday, Great Friday, Black Friday, or Easter Friday, though the last term properly refers to the Friday in Easter week.
 Advent: Advent is the preparation season for Christmas, when the first candle is lit on the Advent wreath and decorations go up. It starts on the first of four Sundays that precede Christmas. It can be as early as 27 November or as late as 3 December, depending on which day of the week Christmas falls. It will start on 1 December if Christmas is on a Wednesday.
Pastafarian
 Holiday: Around the time of Christmas, Hanukkah and Kwanzaa (generally known as the Christmas and holiday season), Pastafarians celebrate a vaguely defined holiday named "Holiday". Holiday does not take place on a specific date so much as it is the Holiday season itself. There are no specific requirements for Holiday, and Pastafarians celebrate Holiday however they please. They also celebrate Pastover and Ramendan.
Religion

Many religions whose holidays were formulated before the worldwide spread of the Gregorian calendar have been assigned to dates either according to their own internal religious calendar, or moon cycles, or otherwise. Even within Christianity, Easter is a movable feast and Christmas is celebrated according to the older Julian calendar instead of the Gregorian by some sects of the religion.

See also

 List of holidays by country
 List of minor secular observances

References

Multinational
Multinational
Multinational